Yonina C. Eldar (born 25 January 1973) is an Israeli professor of electrical engineering at the Weizmann Institute of Science, known for her pioneering work on sub-Nyquist sampling.

Early life and education

Eldar was born in Toronto, Canada. She is the third daughter of Rabbi Meyer and Vicky Berglas. She moved with her family to Israel in 1979. 
She received her B.Sc. degree in physics and the B.Sc. degree in electrical engineering both from Tel Aviv University (TAU), Tel Aviv, Israel, in 1995 and 1996, respectively.

Her Ph.D. degree in electrical engineering and computer science was received from the Massachusetts Institute of Technology (MIT), Cambridge, Massachusetts, in 2002. Eldar authored the thesis Quantum Signal Processing under the supervision of Alan V. Oppenheim. Her postdoctoral research was completed in 2002 at the Digital Signal Processing Group at MIT.

Career

Eldar moved back to Israel in 2002 and became a senior lecturer in the Electrical Engineering Department at the Technion, Haifa. In 2005 she became an associate professor at that department, and in 2010, a full  professor, holding the Edwards Chair in Engineering.

From March 2019 Eldar is a  professor in the Math and Computer Science Department at the Weizmann Institute of Science, Rehovot.
She is also a visiting professor at MIT and a visiting scientist at the Broad Institute, and was a visiting professor at Stanford University. She is also an adjunct professor at Duke University.

Eldar is a member of the Israel Academy of Sciences and Humanities, an IEEE Fellow and a EURASIP 
Fellow.

Work
Her research interests include sampling methods and A/D design, compressed sensing, detection and estimation theory, optimization for signal processing, medical imaging, signal processing and optimization for communication systems, signal and image processing for optics, deep learning and graphs, computational biology.

Upon receiving the IEEE Kiyo Tomiyasu Award (2016), her research work and its implications were described by the award committee:

Publications
Eldar is the author of the book Sampling Theory: Beyond Bandlimited Systems (2015) and co-author of Compressed Sensing (2012) and Convex Optimization Methods in Signal Processing and Communications (2010),
all published by Cambridge University Press.

She has more than 300 published journal articles and has registered more than 20 patents.

Honors and awards
Eldar has received dozens of awards for excellence in research and teaching, including the IEEE Signal Processing Society Technical Achievement Award (2013),
the IEEE/AESS Fred Nathanson Memorial Radar Award (2014), and the IEEE Kiyo Tomiyasu Award (2016). She was a Horev Fellow of the Leaders in Science and Technology program at the Technion (2002) and an Alon Fellow (2003). She received the Michael Bruno Memorial Award from the Rothschild Foundation(2010), the Weizmann Prize for Exact Sciences (2011), the Wolf Foundation Krill Prize for Excellence in Scientific Research (2004), the Henry Taub Prize for Excellence in Research (twice: 2015 and 2007), the Hershel Rich Innovation Award (three times: 2015, 2013 and 2008), the Andre and Bella Meyer Lectureship (2005), the Career Development Chair at the Technion, the Muriel & David Jacknow Award for Excellence in Teaching (2008), and the Technion’s Award for Excellence in Teaching (two times: 2013 and 2009).

She received several best paper awards and best demo awards together with her research students and colleagues, and was selected as one of the 50 most influential women in Israel (2011)   and one of the 50 leading and influential academic women in Asia. She was also a member of the Israel Committee for Higher Education.

She is the Editor in Chief of Foundations and Trends in Signal Processing
and a member of several IEEE Technical Committees and Award Committees.

Personal life
Eldar is married to Rabbi Shalomi. They have 5 children and live in Rehovot.

External links 

 Yonina Eldar's page, Weizmann Institute of Science
 Author Yonina C. Eldar, IEEE
 Eldar's Lecture on Sub-Nyquist Sampling, Technion, 2015

References 

Living people
Israeli electrical engineers
Israeli women engineers
1973 births
Weizmann Institute of Science
Engineers from Toronto
Scientists from Toronto
Tel Aviv University alumni
MIT School of Engineering alumni
Academic staff of Technion – Israel Institute of Technology
Fellow Members of the IEEE
Members of the Israel Academy of Sciences and Humanities
Canadian emigrants to Israel
Canadian people of Israeli descent
Israeli expatriates in the United States